Gopher is an Atari 2600 game written by Sylvia Day and published by U.S. Games in 1982. The player controls a shovel-wielding farmer who protects a crop of three carrots from a gopher.

Gameplay

The gopher tunnels left and right and up to the surface. When he makes a hole to the surface he will attempt to steal a carrot. The farmer must hit the gopher to send him back underground or fill in the holes to prevent him from reaching the surface. If gopher has taken any of the three carrots, a pelican will occasionally fly overhead and drop a seed which, if the farmer catches it, he can plant it in the place of the missing carrot. The longer the game, the faster the gopher gets. The game ends when the gopher successfully removes all three carrots. There are two skill levels and is for one or two players, giving a total of four game variations.

Reception

Legacy
An unlicensed version was released by Zellers in Canada and was called Farmer Dan. it uses the box art of Plaque Attack by Activision.

References

External links
Gopher at Atari Mania
Gopher at AtariAge (archived)
 

1982 video games
Atari 2600 games
Atari 2600-only games
Single-player video games
U.S. Games games
Video games developed in the United States